Christian Louis Henri Beauvalet (18 December 1929 – 23 July 2022) was a French modern pentathlete. He competed at the 1960 Summer Olympics where he finished 45th in the Men's Individual event, and 15th in the team event.

References

External links

1929 births
2022 deaths
French male modern pentathletes
Olympic modern pentathletes of France
Modern pentathletes at the 1960 Summer Olympics
Sportspeople from Alençon
20th-century French people